Walter James Butler (15 April 1892 – 5 November 1937) was an Australian politician. He served in the Australian Infantry Forces as a private, from 1915 to 1919. He was elected as a Labor Party member for the New South Wales Legislative Assembly seat of Hurstville from 1927 to 1932.

References

 

Members of the New South Wales Legislative Assembly
1892 births
1937 deaths
Australian Labor Party members of the Parliament of New South Wales
20th-century Australian politicians